Hopewell is an unincorporated community in Camden County, Georgia, United States. It lies at an elevation of 10 feet (3 m).

References

Unincorporated communities in Camden County, Georgia
Unincorporated communities in Georgia (U.S. state)